Zelenchuksky District (Zelençuk rayon) is an administrative and municipal district (raion), one of the ten in the Karachay-Cherkess Republic, Russia. It is located in the western central part of the republic. Its administrative center is the rural locality (a stanitsa) of Zelenchukskaya. As of the 2010 Census, the total population of the district was 51,780, with the population of Zelenchukskaya accounting for 37.6% of that number.

Administrative and municipal status
Within the framework of administrative divisions, Zelenchuksky District is one of the ten in the Karachay-Cherkess Republic and has administrative jurisdiction over all of its seventeen rural localities. As a municipal division, the district is incorporated as Zelenchuksky Municipal District. Its seventeen rural localities are incorporated into nine rural settlements within the municipal district. The stanitsa of Zelenchukskaya serves as the administrative center of both the administrative and municipal district.

References

Notes

Sources

Districts of Karachay-Cherkessia
